Drexel is a surname and occasional given name. Notable people named Drexel include:

 Anthony Drexel Duke, philanthropist, author, and founder of Boys & Girls Harbor
 Anthony Joseph Drexel (1826–1893), American banker, founder of Drexel, Morgan & Co.
 Anthony Joseph Drexel Biddle Sr. (1874–1948), American soldier, amateur boxer and writer
 Anthony Joseph Drexel Biddle Jr. (1897–1961), American diplomat and soldier
 Brittanee Drexel (born 1991), American high school student who disappeared in 2009
 Constance Drexel (1894–1956), a naturalized American journalist, and Nazi broadcaster
 Drexel Gomez (born 1937), Bahamian Anglican bishop
 Elizabeth Wharton Drexel (1868–1944), American writer and socialite
 Francis Anthony Drexel (1824–1885), American banker
 Francis Martin Drexel (1792–1863), Austrian-American painter and banker, founder of Drexel & Co.
 Hans Drexel (1919–1962), German World War 2 soldier
 Íngrid Drexel (born 1993), Mexican road bicycle racer
 Jeremias Drexel (1581–1638), German Jesuit and professor
 John Drexel, American poet, critic, and editor
 John Armstrong Drexel (1891–1958), American aviation pioneer
 Joseph William Drexel (1833–1888), American banker, philanthropist, and book collector
 Katharine Drexel (1858–1955), American philanthropist, religious sister, and Roman Catholic saint
 Ruth Drexel (1930–2009), German actress and director
 Simone Drexel (born 1957), Swiss singer and songwriter
 Wiltrud Drexel (born 1950), Austrian alpine skier

Occupational surnames